Heterogriffus is a monotypic genus of African crab spiders containing the single species, Heterogriffus berlandi. It was first described by Norman I. Platnick in 1976, and is found in Africa.

See also
 List of Thomisidae species

References

Further reading

Monotypic Araneomorphae genera
Spiders of Africa
Thomisidae